The Central District of Sarbisheh County is a district (bakhsh) in Sarbisheh County, South Khorasan Province, Iran. At the 2006 census, its population was 25,788, in 6,602 families.  The District has one city: Sarbisheh. The District has two rural districts (dehestan): Doreh Rural District and Momenabad Rural District.

References 

Districts of South Khorasan Province
Sarbisheh County